Watford Power Station was a coal-fired power station situated in Watford's Riverside area. The station was built by the Watford Corporation Electricity Department starting with the installation of cables in 1899 with completion around 1900, near the banks of the River Colne. A gas turbine power station was commissioned in 1980.

Development
The power station was built near the Watford and Rickmansworth Railway and a rail siding spurred into the site allowing coal to be brought in from the north Midlands. It appears the original coal-fired power station was a large gothic building with six chimneys; this was utilised until 1968, when the operation became uneconomic.

New generating equipment was added as the demand for electricity increased. The generating capacity, maximum load, and electricity generated and sold was as follows:

In 1923 the electricity plant comprised 1 × 150 kW and 1 × 500 kW reciprocating engines and generators, and 1 × 500 kW, 1 × 650 kW and 2 × 1,250 kW turbo-alternators. The total generating capacity of the station was 4,300 kW. The total output of the boiler plant was 67,200 lb/hr (8.47 kg/s) of steam. Electricity was available as single phase AC, 200V. In 1923 the station generated 6.884 GWh of electricity, some of this was used in the plant, the total amount sold was 5.835 GWh. The revenue from sales of current was £55,695, this gave a surplus of revenue over expenses of £29,720.

By 1961 the installed capacity of the station was 37.25 megawatts (MW), with an output capacity of 27 MW. The oldest operational generating equipment had been installed in 1918. The chain grate boilers had a total steam generating capacity of 300,000 lb/hr (37.8 kg/s), the steam conditions were 250 psi (17.24 bar) and 399 °C. River water and cooling towers were used to condense steam and provide cooling. The overall thermal efficiency of the station in 1967 was 15.45 per cent. The electricity output of the station in its final years was as follows:

The coal-fired station was closed in March 1968. In the early 1970s the site was cleared for a new gas turbine power station.

Gas turbine station
In 1971 the CEGB announced that it was seeking consent to build a new set of gas turbine power stations to meet peak load demands. These would be located near old or redundant stations that were close to centres of demand. The first of these would be at Watford. It was envisaged the plant would cost £6.5 million and be operational in 1975. The project was delayed and the new station at Watford was commissioned in 1980. It had two 70 MW oil-fired gas turbines giving a maximum capability of 140 MW. The electricity output of the gas turbine station was as follows:

The high operational output in 1984-85 is associated with the 1984-5 miners' strike.

The gas turbine station was decommissioned in 1990 and subsequently demolished.

The site is now used for step-down transformers.

References

Power stations in the East of England
Buildings and structures in Watford
Buildings and structures in Hertfordshire